Chris Sanderson was a lacrosse coach and member of the Canadian team defending their world championship.. Sanderson was an assistant coach for the Philadelphia Wings in the National Lacrosse League from 2005 to 2007 season. Sanderson played for parts of five seasons as a goaltender.

Chris was a member of the Sanderson family of Orangeville, Ontario. He was the cousin of current NLL players Josh and Phil, as well as former NLL player Nate, and was the nephew of both former Wings GM Lindsay Sanderson and Toronto GM Terry Sanderson. Lastly, but definitely not least, he was the son of multiple Mann Cup championships winner and hall of fame inductee, Bill Gerrie. He played for multiple MSL teams such as Six Nations, and Brampton Excelsiors, as well as the NLL team Buffalo Bandits.

Sanderson led the University of Virginia Cavaliers to two NCAA Final Fours. He has played in four world championships with the Canadian National Team, and has coached the U-19 Canadian team to a world championship. He also taught at the Pennington School in Pennington, NJ, and owned a lacrosse company and club team known as True North Lacrosse Company.

He was originally diagnosed with a grade IV malignant brain tumor called Glioblastoma Multiforme in December, 2008. The 2006 ILF gold medalist fought back, miraculously representing Canada at the 2010 FIL World Championships in England, helping the Canadians to a silver medal. Sanderson was named to the All-World Team at the goaltender position in the 2010 FIL WC.

Sanderson died of brain cancer on June 28, 2012 at the age of 38.

Statistics

NLL

References

Year of birth missing
2012 deaths
Canadian lacrosse players
Lacrosse people from Ontario
National Lacrosse League coaches
People from Orangeville, Ontario
Philadelphia Wings players
Hamilton Nationals players
Virginia Cavaliers men's lacrosse players
Deaths from brain cancer in the United States
Deaths from cancer in New Jersey